Seven Spires is an American symphonic metal band established in 2013 in Boston. The band was founded by guitarist Jack Kosto and vocalist Adrienne Cowan, who are the main songwriters. Seven Spires debuted a year later with EP The Cabaret of Dreams. Since this debut, and with the permanent lineup additions of bassist Peter de Reyna and drummer Chris Dovas, the band has released 3 studio albums. The first album, Solveig, was produced independently. Afterwards, Seven Spires signed on with Frontiers Music, releasing 2 additional studio albums each with multiple music videos produced by EmVision Productions and released by Frontiers Music.

Seven Spires feature elements of many styles and genres of metal, including melodic death metal and black metal. The band's music focuses around concept albums, usually taking place in the same fictional universe. In independent circles, the band's albums have received strong reviews in particular for their musicianship, technical ability, and emotional storytelling.

The band toured with DragonForce in 2022 and is currently touring with Omnium Gatherum and Eluveitie.

Members 

 Jack Kosto - guitars
 Adrienne Cowan - vocals, keyboards
 Peter de Reyna - bass
 Chris Dovas - drums

Discography 

 Solveig (2017)
  Emerald Seas (2020)
  Gods of Debauchery (2021)

References 

American symphonic metal musical groups
Musical groups established in 2013
Musical groups from Boston
Frontiers Records artists